Bay R 1531 is a tricyclic tryptamine derivative which acts as a selective serotonin receptor 5-HT1A agonist. It was researched unsuccessfully for the treatment of stroke but remains in use for scientific research.

See also 
 8-OH-DPAT
 RDS-127
 RU-28306
 LY-293,284
 NDTDI

References 

Serotonin receptor agonists
Tryptamines